Solirubrobacter taibaiensis  is a Gram-positive, strictly aerobic, rod-shaped and non-motile bacterium from the genus of Solirubrobacter which has been isolated from the stem of the plant Phytolacca acinosa from the Mount Taibai in China.

References

 

Actinomycetota
Bacteria described in 2014